Mojo is the twelfth studio album by American rock band Tom Petty and the Heartbreakers, released on June 15, 2010 on CD and June 29 on Blu-ray. It was Petty's first album with the Heartbreakers in eight years. Mojo debuted at No. 2 on the U.S. Billboard 200, selling 125,000 copies in its first week of release. The album was also the band's first full album with bassist Ron Blair since 1981's Hard Promises, as he played on only two tracks on the previous Heartbreakers album, The Last DJ.

Recording
In November 2009, Petty told Rolling Stone David Fricke that it was his intention to record the album live in the studio without overdubs.

He said of the album's tone, "It's blues-based. Some of the tunes are longer, more jammy kind of music. A couple of tracks really sound like the Allman Brothers – not the songs but the atmosphere of the band."

Promotion and release
The band began streaming the album song "Good Enough" on their website February 24, 2010, followed two days later by "First Flash of Freedom". Videos for "Jefferson Jericho Blues", "First Flash of Freedom", "I Should Have Known It", "Something Good Coming" and "Good Enough" were posted on the band's YouTube channel.

Tom Petty also released five of the songs prior to his and the Heartbreakers' Mojo tour via his YouTube account. The first of these was the single "Good Enough", released March 4, 2010. The songs released were, in order of release:

"Good Enough"
"First Flash of Freedom"
"I Should Have Known It" (official video)
"Something Good Coming" (official video)
"Jefferson Jericho Blues" (official video)

The last three of the songs were clean, non-overdubbed songs filmed in his new studio, as he expressed in a roughly 12-minute "Mojo Documentary". He noted he had had the studio for "eight or nine years", which dates back approximately to before the recording of his previous studio album with the Heartbreakers, The Last DJ.

In addition to his YouTube account, Mojo track list was made available June 8, 2010, via an article on one of ESPN's websites. The article went into brief detail of the tour and songs. Most of the songs were made available on the website through a "Streampad" music player, at least until the album was officially released.

Mojo was released via compact disc and limited edition vinyl (2x LP). The vinyl pressing is largely out of print and is considered a collector's item, selling for large sums in the vinyl aftermarket.

Critical reception

The album has a score of 72 out of 100 from Metacritic based on "generally favorable reviews". ChartAttack gave it a score of 2.5 out of five and said it was "an incredible disappointment" and "a record destined to be a cult hit 10 years from now, recognized as the band's most expansive and sonically adventurous disc. But expectations for Petty and his band are incredibly high, and from a contemporary standpoint, it comes off as lacking memorable hooks and choruses, something we all expect these guys to pull off in their sleep." The Independent, however, gave it all five stars and said "it's one of their very best efforts, as ought to be the case when a band plugs into the potency of raw R'n'B spirit. [...] It's such a perfect alliance of sentiment and setting that Muddy himself might have penned it." The Globe and Mail gave it three out of four stars and said, "The carefree Petty, at this stage of the game, isn't worried about hits. Like Big Bill Broonzy and others, he's found the key to the highway, and he's billed out and bound to go." Uncut gave it three out of five stars and said, "Unfortunately, and rather ironically, Mojo is ultimately undone by the very virtuosity of its creators: the band stumbles repeatedly into that musician's trap of making music that sounds intended principally to impress other musicians."

Track listing

Personnel
Tom Petty and the Heartbreakers
Tom Petty – vocals, guitars (rhythm, lead, bass on "Running Man's Bible"), producer
Mike Campbell – lead guitar, producer
Benmont Tench – acoustic and electric piano, organ
Scott Thurston – rhythm guitar, harmonica
Ron Blair – bass guitar
Steve Ferrone – drums, percussion

Production
Chris Bellman – mastering
Greg Looper – engineer
Ryan Ulyate – producer, recording, mixer
Travis Weidel – recording

Charts

Weekly charts

Year-end charts

References

External links
 

Tom Petty albums
2010 albums
Albums produced by Tom Petty
Reprise Records albums